Damp is a compilation album by experimental/industrial band Foetus, released in November 2006 by Ectopic Ents. Damp collects previously-unreleased material written since 2003, new recordings of rare Foetus material and tracks written by and/or featuring The The, Melvins, and Rotoskop.

Track listing

Personnel 
Adapted from the Damp liner notes.
 J. G. Thirlwell (as Foetus) – vocals, instruments, producer, recording, photography, design

Musicians
 King Buzzo – electric guitar (6)
 Phylr – remixing (10)
 Dale Crover – drums (6)
 Jeff Davidson – guitar and bass guitar (11)
 Rotoskop – instruments (9)
 Jay Wasco – drum programming (1)

Production and additional personnel
 Heung-Heung Chin – art direction
 Scott Hull – mastering

Release history

References

External links
 Damp at foetus.org

2006 compilation albums
Albums produced by JG Thirlwell
Foetus (band) albums